Paratomellidae is a family of acoels.

Taxonomy

Genera
There are two genera recognised in the family Paratomellidae.
 Hesiolicium Crezee & Tyler, 1976
 Paratomella Dörjes, 1966

Species
There are three species recognised in the family Paratomellidae.

References

Acoelomorphs